The Chattanooga Mocs football program is the intercollegiate college football team for the University of Tennessee at Chattanooga located in the U.S. state of Tennessee. The team competes in the NCAA Division I Football Championship Subdivision (FCS) and are members of the Southern Conference. The school's first football team was fielded in 1904. The team plays its home games at the 20,668 seat Finley Stadium. They are coached by UTC alumni, Rusty Wright. He was an assistant coach under Russ Huesman.

Hall of Fame wide receiver Terrell Owens played for the Mocs from 1992 to 1995.

History

Classifications
1937–1945: NCAA College Division
1946–1948: NCAA University Division
1949: NCAA College Division
1950: NCAA University Division
1951–1972: NCAA College Division
1973–1976: NCAA Division II
1977: NCAA Division I
1978–1981: NCAA Division I–A
1982–present: NCAA Division I–AA/FCS

Conference memberships
1899–1913: Independent
1914–1932: Southern Intercollegiate Athletic Association
1931–1941: Dixie Conference
1942–1972: Independent
1973–1976: NCAA Division II Independent
1977–present: Southern Conference

Seasons

Notable former players

 Hugh Beaumont
 C.J. Board
 Abe Cohen
 B. J. Coleman
 Aaron Grant
 Tony Hill
 Spider Johnson
 Chris Jones
 Art Koeninger
 Joe Kopcha
 Corey Levin
 Derrick Lott
 Travis McNeal
 Terrell Owens
 Chris Sanders
 Terdell Sands
 Buster Skrine
 Paul Squibb
 Cole Strange
 Davis Tull
 Keionta Davis
 Kareem Orr
 Nick Tiano

Conference championships
The Mocs have won 15 conference titles, 5 in the SIAA, 3 in the Dixie Conference and 7 in the Southern Conference, with seven shared and eight outright.

† Co-champions

Playoff appearances

National championships
The city of Chattanooga hosted the Division I-AA (now FCS) Football Championship 14 times at Finley Stadium from 1997 to 2009.

References

External links
 

 
American football teams established in 1909
1909 establishments in Tennessee